Wombo (stylized as WOMBO) is a Canadian image manipulation mobile app released in 2021 that uses a provided selfie to create a deepfake of a person lip-synced to one of various songs.

Features 

WOMBO allows users to take a new or existing selfie and then select a song from a curated list to create a video that artificially moves the selfie's head and lips in synchrony with the song. The app works for any and all images that resemble a face, although it works best for three-dimensional characters where they are looking at the camera straight on. These songs are usually related to internet memes, and include "Witch Doctor" and "Never Gonna Give You Up". The head movements created are from existing choreography recorded by a performer who produces specific eye, face and head movements for each song, and are mapped onto the inputted image through artificial intelligence being used to tag the parts of a human face. All outputted videos include a large, obvious watermark, and aim not to look too much like the video is real.

The app includes a premium tier, which gives users priority processing time and no in-app ads.

Wombo processes images in the cloud, unlike earlier apps such as FaceApp. CEO Ben-Zion Benkhin says that all user data is deleted after 24 hours.

Development 

Wombo was developed in Canada and launched in February 2021 after a beta period in January. Wombo CEO Ben-Zion Benkhin says he got the idea for the app in August 2020. The name of the app comes from the slang term "wombo combo" from console game Super Smash Bros. Melee. The app is available on both the App Store and Google Play Store.

Reception 

Within its first three weeks of release, the app was downloaded over 20 million times, and over 100 million clips were created using the app. The sudden boom in deepfake technology has been described as "a cultural tipping point we aren't ready for", as it is now possible to create a deepfake from any picture off social media in a very short amount of time.

References

External links
 

Android (operating system) software
Computer-related introductions in 2021
Photo software
Social media
Deep learning software applications
Deepfakes
Internet memes
Internet memes introduced in 2021